During the 1903–04 English football season, Brentford competed in the Southern League First Division. Despite leading the division in September 1903, disruption behind the scenes and the suspension of manager Dick Molyneux for the final month of the season led to a 13th-place finish.

Season summary 

Directly after the end of the dire 1902–03 season, the Brentford committee decided to act and appoint a first team manager. Dick Molyneux became the first official manager in the club's history and arrived at York Road having served as manager at Everton for 12 years, with a CV boasting one Football League First Division championship and two FA Cup runners-up medals. One of the first major changes Molyneux enacted was to request that the board raise funds to pay adequate summer wages for the playing squad, which would put an end to the failures of previous seasons, when the board waited until almost before the beginning of the season to transfer players in, so as to cut down on off-season wages. Due to the majority of clubs conducting their transfer business shortly after the end of the season, the tactic meant that Brentford were always short on transfer options, when conducting business close to the beginning of the following season. The board raised £330 in donations (equivalent to £ in ) and Molyneux set about building a 16-man all-professional squad which could compete in the Southern League First Division. Of the previous season's squad, only goalkeeper Tommy Spicer, inside left Percy Turner and outside left Tosher Underwood were retained and by early June 1903, Molyneux had signed an almost entirely new XI. Brentford's colours were changed for the first time since the mid-1890s, with the old claret and blue replaced by a kit consisting of gold shirts with blue stripes, white shorts and black socks.

Dick Molyneux's team started season strongly, reaching top spot in the First Division after five matches. The demands on the small squad led Brentford to fall back into mid-table and a goalkeeping crisis suffered in early 1904 exacerbated the problem. Molyneux brought in former trialist John Bishop and paid him money to play, an illegal move as Bishop was a serving soldier with the Scots Guards and therefore an amateur player. After his third appearance, Bishop returned late to barracks, was reported to his commanding officer and then made a statement in writing about his involvement with Brentford. The statement was passed on to the FA, who fined Brentford £25 and suspended director Bill Dodge for two years and manager Molyneux for the final month of the season. With secretary William Lewis in caretaker charge, the Bees took one point from the remaining five matches of the season to finish in 13th position.

One club record was set during the season:
 Most Southern League away draws in a season: 5

League table

Results
Brentford's goal tally listed first.

Legend

Southern League First Division

FA Cup 

 Source: 100 Years of Brentford

Playing squad

Left club during season

 Source: 100 Years of Brentford

Coaching staff

Dick Molyneux (5 September 1903 – March 1904)

William Lewis (March – 23 April 1904)

Statistics

Appearances

Goalscorers 

Players listed in italics left the club mid-season.
Source: 100 Years Of Brentford

Management

Summary

References 

Brentford F.C. seasons
Brentford